Francis Stuart, 10th Earl of Moray KT (2 February 1771 – 12 January 1848) was the son of Francis Stuart, 9th Earl of Moray.

Life

Moray was the eldest son of Francis Stuart, 9th Earl of Murray, and his wife, Jean Gray, daughter of John Gray, 11th Lord Gray. The huge family estate embraced most of Morayshire, embracing towns such as Forres.

From around 1785 Moray lived at Moray House in Edinburgh, situated between Charlotte Square and the Water of Leith.

In 1822 he commissioned James Gillespie Graham to lay out an estate of huge townhouses on what was known as the Moray Feu. The development, begun in 1825, is now known as the Moray Estate, and edges Edinburgh's New Town. Street names are all closely linked to the Moray family. It remains as exclusive an address as when it was first built.

Family

On 26 February 1795, he married Lucy Scott, daughter of General John Scott, and they had two children:

Francis Stuart, 11th Earl of Moray (1795–1859)
John Stuart, 12th Earl of Moray (1797–1867)

Lucy died in 1798 and Francis married Margaret Jane Ainslie, daughter of Col Sir Philip Ainslie of Pilton on 7 January 1801. They had three children:

Archibald George Stuart, 13th Earl of Moray (1810–1872)
George Philip Stuart, 14th Earl of Moray (1816–1895)
Lady Jane Stuart (1817–1880)

References

Earls of Moray
Knights of the Thistle
Lord-Lieutenants of Elginshire
1771 births
1848 deaths